Idris Khattak is a Pakistani human rights activist and convicted felon. In early December 2021 a military court has sentenced Khattak to 14 years in prison for espionage which many human rights experts declared an instance of state repression.

Life
Idris Khattak had previously worked for Amnesty International, Human Rights Watch on a wide range of topics including people illegally disappeared by the military. He holds a PhD in anthropology from Saint Petersburg.

Abduction
Khattak was abducted by four individuals on the Swabi motorway interchange in the province of Khyber Pakhtunkhwa on 13 November 2019.

Khattak has two daughters: Shumaisa and Talia. His movements between 2019 and 2021 are unclear, although in February 2021 Amnesty International reported the Peshawar High Court had denied Khattak's appeal to be tried in a civilian court and that his hearing would instead take place in a military court.

Conviction
He was sentenced to 14 years imprisonment in a secret military court trial in late-2021, not being allowed to defend his case. Human Rights Watch condemned the sentencing, saying that "Pakistan's security forces have with impunity long carried out enforced disappearances" and calling for him to tried publicly in a civilian court. Amnesty International called the sentencing "the culmination of a shameful two-year process that has been unjust from start to finish" and saying that "enforced disappearances must, once and for all, be put to an end."

See also
Mudassar Naaru
List of kidnappings
List of people who disappeared

References

External links
 BBC News interview with Khattak's daughter, Talia
 November 2020 Amnesty International article pertaining to the kidnapping of Idris Khattak

2010s missing person cases
Missing people
Missing person cases in Pakistan
November 2019 crimes in Asia
Kidnapped people
Kidnappings in Pakistan
Pakistani human rights activists
Pashtun people
People from Nowshera District
Year of birth missing
2020s missing person cases
People convicted of treason against Pakistan